The ANFA Cup refers to a series of invitational association football knockout tournaments organised by the All Nepal Football Association. Both National football teams as well as football clubs participated in the past.

History
Although Nepal had been playing football with the teams of various neighboring countries and friendly countries but the necessity to invite countries for competitive matches in Nepal was realized only in 1979 and hence ANFA cup football match was introduced. In the first match of ANFA cup Kathmandu XI team was the winner which was held in Chaitra. To encourage young players Federation of Nepal Football Association started ANFA President shield in the year 1981 in which Three Star Club secured the first position.

Series

*Selection of Nepalese players. Effectively a full national team.

See also
ANFA
Football in Nepal

References

 

 
Football cup competitions in Nepal
All Nepal Football Association